is a city in Kumamoto Prefecture, Japan. The city was founded on February 11, 1942.  the city has an estimated population of 30,752 and a population density of 144 per km2. The total area is 210.55 km2.

It is famous for boat trips on the river and hot springs. Aoi Aso Shrine, one of the National Treasures of Japan, is located in Hitoyoshi.

It is bounded to the north, east, and west by towns of Kuma District, and to the south by Kagoshima Prefecture.

Commerce 
Hitoyoshi's main product is rice shochu (an indigenous spirit distilled from rice), or kuma-shochu, which is the official name of rice shochu produced in Kumamoto's Hitoyoshi and Kuma District. This shochu must be produced in these areas from Japanese rice and with water from the Kuma River, which runs through the town. The World Trade Organization granted kuma-shochu geographical indication status in 1994. The most popular brand is Hakutake Shiro, which currently holds 50% market share on all rice shochu sold in Japan. However, Takahashi Distillery, the producer of Hakutake Shiro, is just one of 28 distilleries in Hitoyoshi in the surrounding region that produce kuma-shochu.

Climate
Hitoyoshi has a humid subtropical climate (Köppen climate classification Cfa) with hot summers and cool winters. Precipitation is significant throughout the year, and is heavier in the summer months, especially June and July.

Tourism
Hitoyoshi Station
 Aoi Aso Shrine
SL Hitoyoshi
Hitoyoshi Castle
Kuma River (Japan)
kuma River Rafting
KAJIYA-MACHI STREET
KOYA-MACHI
Sekaiichi Chiisana Bijutsukan Chobit
Eikokuji
MOZOKA station 868

In popular culture
Hitoyoshi is the inspiration for and setting of "Ohitoyo" in the anime Rail Romanesque and the visual novel game that the anime is derived from.

Notable people from Hitoyoshi

 Tetsuharu Kawakami, baseball player and manager
 Miki Tori, manga artist
 Teruyoshi Uchimura, comedian

See also 
 2020 Kyushu floods

References

External links 

  
 
 

Hitoyoshi, Kumamoto
Cities in Kumamoto Prefecture